Anne-Marie Pålsson, born 23 April 1951, is a Swedish politician of the Moderate Party and economist. She was a member of the Parliament of Sweden from 2002 to 2010. She is also known for starting the Housemaid Debate in July 1993.

References

External links
Anne-Marie Pålsson at the Riksdag website 

Members of the Riksdag from the Moderate Party
Living people
1951 births
Women members of the Riksdag
Members of the Riksdag 2002–2006
21st-century Swedish women politicians